The 2016 Tokyo Darts Masters was the second staging of the tournament (formerly known as the Japan Darts Masters) by the Professional Darts Corporation, as a fourth entry in the 2016 World Series of Darts. The tournament featured eight Japanese players who faced eight PDC players and was held at the Yoyogi National Gymnasium in Tokyo, Japan from 6–7 July 2016.

Phil Taylor was the defending champion, having won the inaugural staging of the Japan Darts Masters after defeating Peter Wright 8–7 in the final, but he lost 8–7 to James Wade in the quarter-finals.

Gary Anderson won the title after beating Michael van Gerwen 8–6 in the final.

Qualifiers
The seeded PDC players were:
  Gary Anderson (winner)
  Michael van Gerwen (runner-up)
  James Wade (semi-finals)
  Adrian Lewis (semi-finals)

The next four seeded PDC players were (drawn at random into seeded side of the draw):

The Japanese qualifiers were:
  Keita Ono (first round)
  Haruki Muramatsu (first round)
  Masahiro Hiraga (first round)
  Seigo Asada (first round)
  Masumi Chino (first round)
  Tsuneki Zaha (first round)
  Shintaro Inoue (first round)
  Chikara Fujimori (first round)

Draw

References

Japan Darts Masters
World Series of Darts
2016 in Japanese sport